Hugó Veigelsberg (2 November 1869, Pest – 3 August 1949, Budapest) was a noted Hungarian editor and writer who usually published under the pen name Ignotus (Latin for "unknown").  He was distinguished for the lyric individuality of his poems, stories, and sociological works.  In addition to "Ignotus", he also wrote under the pseudonyms "Dixi," "Pató Pál," and "Tar Lorincz".

His works include A Slemil Keservei (1891), Versek (1894), Vallomások (1900), and Végzet, a translation of a novel by the Dutch author Louis Couperus. He also founded the literary magazine Nyugat. His father was the journalist Leó Veigelsberg, and his son Pál (Paul) Ignotus (1901–1978) was a journalist and writer who worked for the BBC during World War II.

External links
 
 

1869 births
1949 deaths
People from Pest, Hungary
Hungarian Jews
Hungarian male poets
19th-century Hungarian poets
19th-century Hungarian male writers
20th-century Hungarian poets
20th-century Hungarian male writers
Hungarian short story writers
Hungarian translators